Kim Hee-ra (born March 23, 1947) is a South Korean actor.

Filmography

Awards and nominations

References

External links 
 
 
 

1947 births
Living people
South Korean male film actors
South Korean Buddhists
Best New Actor Paeksang Arts Award (film) winners